Lima Village Historic District is a national historic district located at Lima in Livingston County, New York. The district encompasses 21 commercial, religious, civic, and residential properties in the historic core of the incorporated village of Lima and centered on the Four Corners business district.  The buildings date from about 1845 to about 1923.  Highlights of the district include significant examples of finely crafted Greek Revival and Italianate style commercial buildings with remarkably intact storefronts.

It was listed on the National Register of Historic Places in 1987.

References

Historic districts on the National Register of Historic Places in New York (state)
Colonial Revival architecture in New York (state)
Historic districts in Livingston County, New York
National Register of Historic Places in Livingston County, New York